Robert Harper Shumaker (born May 11, 1933) is a retired rear admiral and naval aviator in the United States Navy. He spent eight years and one day as a prisoner of war (POW) in North Vietnam. He notably coined the term "Hanoi Hilton”
for the notorious Hỏa Lò Prison.

Early life
Shumaker was born on May 11, 1933 at New Castle, Pennsylvania. His father Alvah was a lawyer and his mother Eleanor was a writer. He attended Northwestern University for a year and then the United States Naval Academy, graduating with a Bachelor of Science degree in 1956.

Military career
After graduating from the U.S. Naval Academy, he then completed flight training, earning his designation as a Naval Aviator in January 1958. After flight training, Shumaker eventually joined VF-32, a fighter squadron in Jacksonville, Florida. He was a finalist in the Apollo astronaut selection, but a temporary physical ailment prevented his selection in 1963.

He graduated from the U.S. Naval Postgraduate School with a Master of Science degree in aeronautical engineering. Shumaker joined VF-154 in San Diego.

Vietnam War and capture

LCDR Shumaker was an F-8D pilot assigned to VF-154 on board the carrier USS Coral Sea. Shumaker's aircraft was shot down by 37mm cannon fire on February 11, 1965 and his parachute opened a mere  from the ground, and he was captured by the North Vietnamese. He was the second Navy aviator to be captured. The aircraft was destroyed.

The impact broke his back and he was placed in a jeep and transported over the rutted roads to Hanoi. Upon arrival in Hanoi, a white-smocked North Vietnamese gave him a cursory examination before dozens of photographers yet did not give him any medical attention. His back healed itself, but it was six months before he could bend.

For the next eight years, Shumaker was held in various prisoner of war camps, including the infamous Hỏa Lò Prison in Hanoi dubbed the "Hanoi Hilton". Shumaker, as a prisoner, was known for devising all sorts of communications systems, including the notable tap code system and never getting caught. Like other POWs, he was badgered to write a request for amnesty from Ho Chi Minh, which he refused to do. As punishment, the Vietnamese forced Shumaker to stay in a cell with no heat and no blankets during the winter. After about a week, Shumaker had not relented, and he was forced to kneel for another week. Finally, he was kneeling on broom handles with boards on his shoulders. After a month the Vietnamese finally broke him and went on to the next POW.

Shumaker was released in Operation Homecoming on February 12, 1973. He had been promoted to the rank of commander during his captivity. His fellow POWs consider him as a resister, leader, and patriot.

Post-naval career
He was briefly hospitalised to recover from his injuries at Balboa Naval Hospital, from February to June 1973, and then attended the U.S. Naval Postgraduate School to complete his master's degree and PhD in electrical engineering from June 1973 to June 1977.  Shumaker next served as a project manager for smart missiles with the Naval Air Systems Command at NAS Patuxent River, from June 1977 to June 1983, followed by service as superintendent of the Naval Postgraduate School from June 1983 to June 1986.

His final assignment was as director of the Tactical Air, Surface & Electronic Warfare Development Division in the Office of the Chief of Naval Operations at the Pentagon from June 1986 until his retirement from the Navy on February 1, 1988 at the rank of rear admiral.

Later life
After retiring from the Navy, Shumaker became an assistant dean at George Washington University and later became the associate dean of the Center for Aerospace Sciences at the University of North Dakota.

In April 2011 he was presented with the Distinguished Graduate Award from the United States Naval Academy

Awards and decorations
During his lengthy career, Shumaker earned many decorations, including:

Personal life
Shumaker married Lorraine Shaw in 1963. They have one son Grant, who is a neurosurgeon in Dakota Dunes, South Dakota. Shumaker and his wife currently live in Fairfax Station, Virginia. He is the uncle of former Illinois Congressman Robert Dold.

Gallery

References

1933 births
Living people
People from New Castle, Pennsylvania
People from Fairfax Station, Virginia
United States Naval Aviators
United States Navy admirals
Northwestern University alumni
United States Naval Academy alumni
Shot-down aviators
Vietnam War prisoners of war
United States Navy personnel of the Vietnam War
Recipients of the Navy Distinguished Service Medal
Recipients of the Legion of Merit
Recipients of the Distinguished Flying Cross (United States)